Ahn Se-ha (born Ahn Jae-wook on January 29, 1986) is a South Korean actor.

Personal life
On April 6, 2017, JUST Entertainment revealed that Ahn was set to marry his girlfriend of over a year. The prospective bride is his fellow college and an ordinary citizen of the same age. The wedding ceremony was held in Apgujeong, Gangnam, Seoul on May 14, 2017.

Filmography

Television series

Film

Variety show

Theater

Musical

Awards and nominations

References

External links
 at Hunus Entertainment 

South Korean male television actors
South Korean male film actors
South Korean male stage actors
1986 births
Living people
Kyungnam University alumni
People from Changwon
21st-century South Korean male actors
South Korean television personalities